Lee Ru-ma (born 15 February 1978), better known by his stage name Yiruma, is a South Korean pianist and composer.

Biography
Yiruma was born in Seoul to a pastor. At age five, he began learning the piano and moved to the United Kingdom, where he attended the Purcell School for Young Musicians and graduated from King's College London.

After graduation, Yiruma returned to South Korea and released his debut album, Love Scene, in 2001. He gained wider public recognition for performing the piano versions of the soundtracks from the popular 2006 drama Spring Waltz. On 1 January 2009, he became a DJ for KBS 1FM Yiruma's Music from All Around the World.

Yiruma's 2011 compilation album The Best: Reminiscent, 10th Anniversary debuted at number three in the Billboard classical charts in July 2020 and reached number one just two weeks later; Billboard classical charts had done away with its rules of only counting albums sold in the United States and recognizing albums released in the last eighteen months. His music has seen a resurgence in popularity due to the COVID-19 pandemic lockdowns in 2020. Several videos of his compositions posted on YouTube and other social media platforms have garnered millions of views, including "River Flows in You".

Personal life
Yiruma previously held British citizenship, which he voluntarily renounced in order to enlist for mandatory military service. He enlisted in the Republic of Korea Navy in July 2006 and was assigned to public relations duties. He was discharged in August 2008.

In April 2007, while on leave, Yiruma married his girlfriend Son Hye-im, the older sister of actress and former Miss Korea contestant Son Tae-young. In 2008, they had a daughter.

Discography

Studio albums

Compilation and special albums

Film soundtracks

 Oasis and Yiruma (2002)
 Doggy Poo OST (2002)

Live albums
 Yiruma: Live at HOAM Art Hall (2005)

Extended plays

Singles

References

External links
 
 
 

1978 births
Living people
21st-century composers
21st-century male pianists
Alumni of King's College London
Musicians from Seoul
New-age pianists
People educated at Purcell School
People who lost British citizenship
Republic of Korea Navy personnel
South Korean Christians
South Korean film score composers
South Korean pianists